The first season of Yu-Gi-Oh! Duel Monsters, based on the manga by Kazuki Takahashi, premiered in Japan on April 18, 2000, and concluded on April 3, 2001, on TV Tokyo. The season was directed by Kunihisa Sugishima, and written by Junki Takegami, Masashi Sogo, and Shin Yoshida. The English version of this season premiered in the United States on September 29, 2001  on Kids' WB, and concluded on November 9, 2002. 

The season follows Yugi Mutou and his friends - Katsuya Jonouchi, Hiroto Honda, and Anzu Mazaki (renamed to Joey Wheeler, Tristan Taylor and Téa Gardener in the English adaptation) - to Duelist Kingdom, a tournament on the island of the same name, to free the soul of his grandfather, Sugoroku (renamed Solomon Moto in the English adaptation) from imprisonment by Pegasus J. Crawford (renamed Maximillion Pegasus in the English adaptation). The last ten episodes deal with the aftermath of Yugi's duel with Pegasus, including several filler episodes featuring original storylines not seen in the manga.

Between September 24, 2002 and February 22, 2005, Funimation released twenty DVD sets for the season: twelve sets containing three episodes, three containing four episodes, one with two episodes, one containing all forty-nine episodes and the last three containing uncut versions of the first nine episodes. All DVDs were encoded in Region 1. The first season of Yu-Gi-Oh! Duel Monsters was formerly licensed by 4Kids Entertainment in North America, and other English-speaking territories and countries, and was formerly distributed by FUNimation Entertainment, LTD. on Region 1 home video and formerly distributed by Warner Bros. Television Animation through North American TV rights, when it aired on Kids’ WB! and Cartoon Network. It is now licensed and distributed by 4K Media.

Cast and characters

Japanese

Regular
 Hidehiro Kikuchi as Hiroto Honda
 Hiroki Takahashi as Katsuya Jonouchi
 Kenjiro Tsuda as Seto Kaiba
 Maki Saitoh as Anzu Mazaki
 Shunsuke Kazama as Yugi Moto/Yami Yugi

Recurring
 Hajime Komada as Keith Howard
 Haruhi Terada as Mai Kujaku
 Jirou Jay Takasugi as Pegasus J. Crawford
 Junkoh Takeuchi as Mokuba Kaiba
 You Inoue as Ryou Bakura/Yami Bakura
 Tadashi Miyazawa as Sugoroku Mutou
 Urara Takano as Insector Haga
 Yuuichi Nakamura as Dinosaur Ryuzaki

Guest stars
 Daisuke Namikawa as Ryouta Kajiki
 Eiji Takemoto as Takaido
 Harî Kaneko as Killer Player (PaniK)
 Kaori Tagami as Rebecca Hopkins
 Masami Suzuki as Ghost Kotsuzuka
 Mika Sakenobe as Shizuka Kawai
 Norihisa Mori as Satake
 Ryo Naitou as Ryuji Otoga

English

Regular
 Amy Birnbaum as Téa Gardner
 Sam Riegal as Tristan Taylor (Episodes 1-10)
 Wayne Grayson as Joey Wheeler
 Dan Green as Yugi Moto/Yami Yugi
 John Campbell as Tristan Taylor (Episodes 11+)
 Eric Stuart as Seto Kaiba

Recurring
 Maddie Blaustein as Solomon Moto
 Darren Dunstan as Maximillion Pegasus
 Megan Hollingshead as Mai Valentine
 Tara Jayne as Mokuba Kaiba
 Ted Lewis as Bakura Ryou, "Bandit" Keith Howard, Croquet
 Sam Riegal as Rex Raptor
 Jimmy Zoppi as Weevil Underwood
 Andrew Rannells as Mako Tsunami

Guest stars
 Amy Birnbaum as Bonz
 Maddie Blaustein as Zygor
 David Moo as PaniK
 Lisa Ortiz as Serenity Wheeler
 Marc Thompson as Duke Devlin
 Kerry Williams as Rebecca Hawkins
 Eric Stuart as Kemo, Sid
 Mike Pollock as Arthur Hawkins

Episode list

DVD releases
The first ten DVD volumes, as well as volumes 12 and 13, contain 3 episodes each. Volumes 11, 15, and 16 contain four episodes each and the fourteenth volume contains two episodes. The first volume was released on September 24, 2002. The complete first season set was released on August 10, 2004.

References

2000 Japanese television seasons
2001 Japanese television seasons
Duel Monsters (season 1)